The Les Challenges de la Marche Verte is a series of One-day races held annually since 2010 in Morocco. It consists of three One-day races; GP Sakia El Hamra, GP Oued Eddahab and GP Al Massira, each rated 1.2 and is part of UCI Africa Tour.

Winners – GP Sakia El Hamra

Winners – GP Oued Eddahab

Winners – GP Al Massira

References

Cycle races in Morocco
2011 establishments in Morocco
Recurring sporting events established in 2010
UCI Africa Tour races